This is a list of MBS anime that have been licensed or have yet to air on the network.

A
 Altair: A Record of Battles
 Animeism (programming block)
 Attack on Titan (seasons 1–3)

B
 Basquash!
 Big Windup!
 Black Butler
 Blood+
 Blood-C
 Blue Exorcist
Blast of Tempest

C
 Casshern Sins
 Cat Planet Cuties
 Charlotte
 Clannad
 Classroom Crisis
 Code Geass

D
 Darker than Black
 Dance Dance Danseur
 Danganronpa Devil Lady Dokkoida Dogtanian and the Three Muskehounds Disgaea Durarara!!Domestic Girlfriend

Е
 Eureka Seven Eureka Seven: AOF
 Food Wars!: Shokugeki no Soma Fullmetal Alchemist Fullmetal Alchemist: BrotherhoodG
 Ginga Hyōryū Vifam Gunparade March Golden Time
 Gundam Reconguista in GH
 Haganai Haikyū!! Hell Girl The Heroic Legend of ArslanI
 The IdolmasterJ
 Jujutsu KaisenK
 K
 Kill la Kill KimiKiss Kuroko's BasketballL
 Love Lab Lovely ComplexM
 Macross 7 Macross Frontier Magi: The Labyrinth of Magic Makai Senki Disgaea Mawaru-Penguindrum Mobile Suit Gundam SEED Mobile Suit Gundam SEED Destiny Mobile Suit Gundam 00 Mobile Suit Gundam AGE Mobile Suit Gundam: Iron-Blooded Orphans Mouretsu Pirates My Hero Academia (season 1)

N
 Nanatsuiro Drops Natsuiro KisekiO
 Oh! Edo Rocket Ookiku Furikabutte O Maidens in Your Savage SeasonP
 Persona 4: The Animation Persona 5: The Animation Persona: Trinity Soul Puella Magi Madoka MagicaR
 Release the Spyce Rent-A-Girlfriend RWBY: Ice QueendomS
 Sengoku Basara: Samurai Kings Senki Zesshou Symphogear GX The Seven Deadly Sins (seasons 1–3)
 Shakugan no Shana Shin Megami Tensei: Devil Survivor 2 Shinkyoku Sōkai Polyphonica Sore ga Seiyuu Space Battleship Yamato 2199 SSSS.Dynazenon SSSS.Gridman Star Driver: Kagayaki no Takuto The Super Dimension Fortress Macross The Super Dimension Fortress Macross II: Lovers, Again The Super Dimension Fortress Macross: Do You Remember Love? Sweet Valerian Sword Art OnlineT
 Tales of the Abyss Tenpō Ibun Ayakashi Ayashi Tiger & Bunny Toaru Kagaku no Railgun Toaru Majutsu no Index Toward the TerraU
 Uta no Prince-samaX
 xxxHolic''

References

MBS
MBS
Mainichi Broadcasting System original programming